is a railway station in Otaru, Hokkaido, Japan, operated by the Hokkaido Railway Company (JR Hokkaido). It is numbered "S15".

Lines
Otaru Station is served by the Hakodate Main Line.

Station layout
The station consists of two island platforms serving four tracks. The station has automated ticket machines, automated turnstiles which accept Kitaca, and a "Midori no Madoguchi" staffed ticket office.

Platforms

History
Otaru Station opened on 28 June 1903.
The station name was originally . From 11 June 1900 to 14 July 1920, present-day Minami-Otaru Station was called Otaru Station.

Surrounding area
 Otaru Park
 Otaru City Office
 Otaru University of Commerce

See also
 List of railway stations in Japan

References

External links

 JR Hokkaido

Railway stations in Otaru
Railway stations in Japan opened in 1903